Thrikkadeeri -I  is a village in Palakkad district in the state of Kerala, India.

Demographics
 India census, Thrikkadeeri -I had a population of 12666 with 5825 males and 6841 females.

References

Villages in Palakkad district